Deh Chenar-e Olya (also Romanized as Deh Chenār-e ‘Olyā and Deh Chenār ‘Olyā; also known as Deh Chenār-e Bālā, Deh-e Chenār, Deh-i-Chenār, and Shahrū’ī-ye Bālā) is a village in Khanmirza Rural District, Khanmirza District, Lordegan County, Chaharmahal and Bakhtiari Province, Iran. At the 2006 census, its population was 54, in 11 families. The village is populated by Lurs.

References 

Populated places in Lordegan County
Luri settlements in Chaharmahal and Bakhtiari Province